Glipostenoda takaosana is a species of beetle in the genus Glipostenoda. It was described in 1932.

Subspecies
Glipostenoda takaosana madara (Nomura, 1966)
Glipostenoda takaosana takaosana (Kôno, 1932)

References

takaosana
Beetles described in 1932
Taxa named by Hiromichi Kono